Kingston v Preston (1773) 2 Doug KB 689 is an English contract law case, concerning the right to withhold performance for a contract.

Facts
Kingston, a silk-mercer, sued Preston, a business owner for failing to convey the business to Kingston and his nephew after Kingston served for a year and a quarter. They had agreed Preston would convey the stock in trade over a period of time, in return for Kingston providing security. But Kingston never provided the security. Kingston sued.

Judgment
Lord Mansfield held that because the security was a condition precedent to Preston’s performance, Preston had been entitled to withhold conveyance. Lord Mansfield gave a judgment which was recorded as follows:

See also

United Kingdom enterprise law

Notes

References

United Kingdom enterprise case law